Hyperolius montanus (common name: mountain reed frog or montane reed frog) is a species of frog in the family Hyperoliidae. It is endemic to Kenya and known from the Kenya Highlands. It might represent more than one species.

Description
Colour pattern is variable. Dorsum is uniformly greyish brown to light brown, yellow, or greenish. A dark brown canthal stripe runs from behind the eye to shoulder or groin. Males have yellow to white throat, or green in green-backed specimens. Ventrum is whitish and feet are whitish to yellowish.

Habitat and conservation
Hyperolius montanus is an adaptable species that lives in montane grassland and farmland, montane rainforest, and moor land at elevations of approximately  asl. It is a common species that is locally abundant. No significant threats have been identified, although pesticides and other agro-chemicals could be a local threat.

References

montanus
Frogs of Africa
Amphibians of Kenya
Endemic fauna of Kenya
Taxa named by Fernand Angel
Amphibians described in 1924
Taxonomy articles created by Polbot